The naval Battle of the Lizard took place on 21 October 1707 during the War of the Spanish Succession near Lizard Point, Cornwall between two French squadrons under René Duguay-Trouin and Claude de Forbin and an English convoy protected by a squadron under Commodore Richard Edwards.

Duguay-Trouin and Forbin were two of the most successful French naval commanders and they caused much damage to the allied merchant fleet.

Battle
On 20 October 1707 a large merchant fleet consisting of 80 to 130 English ships left Plymouth for Portugal with supplies for the war in Spain. There were five escorting English ships under command of Commodore Edwards.

The next day near Lizard Point they were spotted by 2 French squadrons of 6 ships each. Technically Forbin was the senior French officer, but Duguay-Trouin was the more aggressive, and his ships led the attack and suffered most of the damage, after Forbin had discovered the British convoy.

This battle was almost a complete victory for the French; the 80-gun Cumberland and the 50-gun ships Chester and Ruby were taken, but Royal Oak escaped into Kinsale with a few merchantmen. The 80-gun Devonshire defended herself for several hours against seven French ships until she caught fire and blew up, only three men escaping out of 500.

There is no unanimity on the number of merchant ships captured. French sources speak of 60 ships out of 80, some British of none at all. The fact that René Duguay-Trouin and Claude de Forbin quarrelled for many years about which of the two squadrons had the biggest role in the victory, points to a considerable number of ships captured. Probably the truth is somewhere in between: Polak in "Bibliographie maritime française" speaks of 15 merchant ships captured.

Order of battle

Britain (Edwards)

France (Forbin)

France (Duguay-Trouin)

Notes

References
 Allen, Joseph. Battles of the British Navy: from A.D. 1000 to 1840. Bell & Daldy publishing (1872) ASIN: B00087UD9S

External links
 Jean et Michèle Polak: "Bibliographie maritime française"
 Commission Française d'Histoire Militaire 
 HMS Chester
 HMS Devonshire

Conflicts in 1707
1707 in England
Naval battles involving Great Britain
Naval battles involving France
Naval battles of the War of the Spanish Succession
Military history of Cornwall
18th-century military history of France